Ray May (born June 4, 1945) is a former professional American football linebacker. May played college football at the University of Southern California after playing at Los Angeles City College and played in the National Football League (NFL) from 1967 to 1975.

1945 births
Living people
American football linebackers
African-American players of American football
USC Trojans football players
Pittsburgh Steelers players
Baltimore Colts players
Denver Broncos players
Los Angeles City College alumni
21st-century African-American people
20th-century African-American sportspeople